Miles Chamley-Watson, (born December 3, 1989) is a British-born American right-handed foil fencer, 11-time team Pan American champion, 2019 team world champion, 2013 individual world champion, two-time Olympian, and 2016 team Olympic bronze medalist.

Childhood
Miles Chamley-Watson was born in London. He is of Jamaican, Irish, British, and Malawian descent. He spent the first eight years of his life as a resident of the UK until he and his family moved to the United States.  Upon arriving to the US, Chamley-Watson and his family settled in New York City, where he began fencing one year later, at the Knox School in Saint James, New York. After spending four years in New York City, Chamley-Watson and his family settled in Philadelphia.

College
Chamley-Watson earned a full scholarship to the Pennsylvania State University in the year 2008. During his tenure at Penn State, Chamley-Watson majored in Sports Management, where he transferred what he had learned and what he was continuing to learn from the sport of fencing to help boost his knowledge in his area of study.

First year (2008–2009)
During Chamley-Watson's first year as a Division I NCAA fencer, he maintained a 19–4 record. He advanced to the semi-finals round in the national championship tournament in the men's foil category.  However, Chamley-Watson was defeated in the semi-finals 15 to 14 by teammate Nicholas Chinman. The Nittany Lions Fencing team ended the tournament on top as the 2008–2009 National Team Champions.

Second year (2009–2010)
Much like his first year, Chamley-Watson went to the semi-final round of the NCAA championships. This time, Chamley-Watson was defeated by Notre Dame's Olympic fencer Gerek Meinhardt.

Junior year (2010–2011)
Nearing the end of his collegiate career, Chamley-Watson had the choice to redshirt his junior year of college or choose to compete and redshirt his senior year. Chamley-Watson decided to compete in the NCAA Championships his junior year and redshirt his senior year.

Senior year (2011–2012)
After finishing 2nd place in men's foil at the NCAA tournament, Chamley-Watson decided that it was time to utilize his allotted red shirt year. During this hiatus from NCAA competition, Chamley-Watson privately practiced fencing. Chamley-Watson would earn himself the top spot on the United States' Olympic Fencing team as a foil fencer.

International career
Chamley-Watson entered the 2012 Summer Olympics as the No. 2 ranked foil fencer. His first round in the games he was presented a bye into the next round. In the second round, Chamley-Watson fenced Alaaeldin Abouelkassem, an opponent representing the country of Egypt, and was defeated 15 – 10. Abouelkassem went on to earn the silver medal in the event.  In the team event, the United States beat France 45–39 in the quarterfinals, but lost 24–45 to Italy in the semi-final.  In the bronze medal fight, the United States lost 27–45 to Germany.

At the 2013 World Championships, Chamley-Watson became the first US fencer to win an individual gold medal at the World Championships.

At the 2016 Olympics, Chamley-Watson again lost in the second round, this time to Russia's Artur Akhmatkhuzin, 13–15. In the team event, the United States beat Egypt 45–27 in the quarterfinals, before losing 41–45 to Russia in the semi-finals.  In the bronze medal match, the United States beat Italy 45–31.

Medal Record

Olympic Games

World Championship

Pan American Championship

Grand Prix

World Cup

Personal life
Chamley-Watson has recently been involved in voters rights, participating the ID check with VoteRiders and urging his followers to do the same. He is currently dating Riverdale actress Madelaine Petsch.

See also
List of Pennsylvania State University Olympians
List of USFA Division I National Champions

References

External links

1989 births
American male foil fencers
Living people
Fencers at the 2012 Summer Olympics
Fencers at the 2016 Summer Olympics
Olympic bronze medalists for the United States in fencing
Medalists at the 2016 Summer Olympics
Pan American Games medalists in fencing
Pan American Games gold medalists for the United States
Sportspeople from London
Fencers at the 2011 Pan American Games
Medalists at the 2011 Pan American Games
Sportspeople from New York City
Sportspeople from Philadelphia
English emigrants to the United States